Drama is a graphic novel written by American cartoonist Raina Telgemeier which centers on the story of Callie, a middle school student and theater-lover who works in her school's drama production crew. While navigating seventh grade, Callie deals with tween hardship, including confusing crushes, budding friendships, and middle school drama. It is a coming-of-age story that explores themes of friendship, teamwork, inclusion, and determination through Callie and her relationship with the people around her.

Although the novel has received much praise for the normalization of the LGBTQ community and consequently winning multiple awards, it has also been the source of much controversy. Drama has appeared in the American Library Association's List of top ten challenged books for its inclusion of LGBTQ characters and ultimately became the seventh-most banned book between 2010 and 2019.

Background 
In an interview with School Library Journal, author Raina Telgemeier responds to a question about her inspiration for the graphic novel by saying she wrote from her life experiences, such as what she felt, saw and knew. Although Drama is a work of fiction, she draws from her personal experiences to create content. In high school, Telgemeier was in the choir and sang in the ensemble for many school plays, which ultimately drew her inspiration for writing Drama. Several characters in the graphic novel are based on real people in Telgemeier's own personal life. The twin brothers, Jesse and Justin, resemble two of Telgemeier's actual friends, and their in-book personalities mirror their real-life personalities. Although Telgemeier originally intended the characters to be high schoolers, Scholastic believed the setting was more appropriate for middle school.

The graphic novel itself combines both manga and comic forms, which the author frequently read while growing up. Telgemeier has since continued to write graphic novels with a similar growing up theme for her four other novels of Sisters, Smile, Guts, and Ghosts.

Summary 
The main character of Drama is Callie Marin, a grade seven student, major theatre enthusiast and member of the Theatre Tech Department's stage crew at Eucalyptus Middle School. In the first scene, she is walking home with her friends Greg and Matt Solano – who are also brothers – where she confesses her feelings for Greg, an upperclassmen baseball superstar and one of her best friends. Greg responds by blushing and saying that Callie "is cool, but..." And Callie says that the girl, Bonnie Lake, that Greg recently broke up with was stuck up and a drama queen. Much to Callie's delight, she shares a kiss with Greg. At school, Callie joins the meeting of the stage crew, led by Mr. Madera and student stage manager Loren, announcing the upcoming production of the fictional Civil War-era romantic musical Moon over Mississippi with her as returning set designer and is excited to implement her plans. She envisions an exploding cannon for the play; although, there are doubts from her peers about its feasibility. Later on, Callie meets identical twin brothers Justin and Jesse Mendocino. Justin is eager to try out for the musical, but Jesse is too shy.

The next day, Callie goes to the mall with Jesse and Justin, where she shows them a book about set designs and describes her love for theatre production and her dreams for the future. As they wait for the twins' father to pick them up, Jesse and Justin sing one of the songs from the musical. Callie is shocked by their talent and propositions them to join the musical. Jesse rejects Callie's suggestion; however, he accepts her follow-up offer to work on stage crew with her. The next day at school, Callie's friend Matt, a lighting crew member for the musical and Greg's younger brother, angrily confronts her and she is confused over his sudden aggression. She then proceeds to sit with Justin during lunch, where he shares that he is gay (though he is slightly embarrassed when he does), and although Callie is initially shocked, she supports him nonetheless.

Callie and Jesse then watch the auditions for Moon over Mississippi, where the lead role is granted to West Redding, which disappoints Justin. Callie confesses her crush on Jesse to her best friend Liz, who suggests that she invite him to the upcoming school dance. The following day, Callie goes to the bookstore with the twins and asks if their father knows that Justin is gay, to which Justin responds no. In school the next day, to counteract the lack of ticket sales, Callie decides to demonstrate her cannon in front of the student body, which generates excitement and an increase in tickets.

The first two nights of the musical are a success, but the third night is marred after West breaks up with Bonnie just before the final performance. She then locks herself in a supply closet and refuses to come out, forcing the stage crew to frantically find Jesse as a backup, decked out in a red dress. He performs well and even shares a kiss with West like the role calls for. Following his performance, Jesse asks Callie to the dance, and during the slow dance Callie embraces him, and suddenly, Jesse ditches her to talk alone with West outside. Callie and Jesse have an argument about him leaving her during the dance, during which Jesse implies that he is also gay and makes a comment about how Callie falls for every nice guy. She angrily storms off in response and coincidentally runs into Greg. They go for a walk so she can clear her mind. During the walk, Greg tries to kiss Callie, but she refuses due to his reaction the last time they kissed. Later, Callie meets with Jesse where he apologizes and thanks her for helping him break out of his shell, stating if he were to date a girl it would be her. Matt then confesses his crush on Callie that was the cause of him lashing out at her during musical rehearsal, apologizing for his actions. At the end of the novel, the stage crew celebrates the success of the musical and Callie is named the new stage crew manager for the following year, much to her excitement.

Genre and style 
Drama can be classified as a graphic novel because of the integration of text and comic style art.

This particular genre of Drama has received praise from visual literacy and critical reading professor Meryl Jaffe. Jaffe believes that Telgemeier's illustrations a "sense of place, touch, and feel" which allow readers to further connect with the characters and events in the book, as compared to a regular novel. Jaffe suggests that the depiction of a diverse student body helps to normalize the process of coming out. The diversity featured in the illustrations convey that everyone, regardless of appearance or background, experience similar challenges with self-identity. She argues that Telgemeier's creative decisions, such as using facial expressions to reveal emotion and color to express mood, allow readers to better comprehend the complexities of the situations that the characters experience. Through her illustrations, Telgemeier is able to successfully address difficult subjects, specifically the LGBTQ relationships depicted in Drama.

The graphic novel genre of Drama is also praised by college librarian Eti Berland, who contends that the use of the graphic novel style allows readers to imagine themselves in the book. By having a visual representation of the challenges the characters face, readers not only develop a more personal understanding of LGBTQ experiences, but also gain a better sense of empathy for others in similar situations outside of the novel. For readers who identify as LGBTQ, Berland argues that Telgemeier's positive depiction of LGBTQ characters in Drama serves to validate their experiences, and make them feel more included in modern literature.

Professor of literature Michelle Ann Abate emphasizes certain issues with Telgemeier's graphics. She claims that the illustrations and creative choices in the novel carry white supremacist and racist overtones. For example, Abate points out that West Redding, who bears a striking resemblance to Ashley Wilkes from the movie Gone with the Wind, is the only character in the book whose eye color is depicted. With his blue eyes, blond hair, and role as the male lead for the play Moon Over Mississippi, West seems to symbolize "white racial purity." Another aspect Abate finds troubling is the similarity between Justin performing a dance routine in the school play and the caricature of Jim Crow performing a minstrel dance. This is especially emphasized because Justin plays a comedic role in the performance, similar to the role Jim Crow. Abate argues that the uncanny resemblance between Telgemeier's illustrations and racially charged images presents a tension that complicates the issue of race in Drama, and renders the novel much less progressive than most critics believe.

Analysis

Presentation of questioning identity and coming out 
College librarian Eti Berland credits Raina Telgemeier for using Justin's coming out to show that sharing one's sexual identity is an important aspect of adolescent life. Justin casually reveals his sexual orientation to Callie, conveying the message that coming out has become increasingly normalized in young people's lives.

Berland states that Jesse's case is more complex as he learns to come to terms with his sexual identity. His process of coming out is slow and closely related to his fear of being judged. Performing in the play is a major catalyst to the development of his identity as he comes to terms with his sexuality. Despite the initially worrisome situation Jesse finds himself in after ditching Callie in the school play, his coming out story is "challenging but affirming" where he finds an accepting and supportive community.

West's process of coming out is still burgeoning. He displays signs of perpetually self-questioning tweens who "recognize the fluidity of identity." He represents the idea that the "gay-straight divide" is slowly fading by continuously doubting his sexuality without selecting a label, "still doesn't know if he's really gay, or whatever the character its self is probably pan or bi." Due to this, West is able choose what he wants to self-identify as.

Portrayal of hegemonic masculinity 
Berland states that Raina Telgemeier portrays hegemonic masculinity or in other words toxic masculinity in Drama through the experiences of Matt and Jesse, who struggle in adhering to institutional and "social structures" such as dating and sports. In Matt's case, the pressure of society to conform to the ideals of "real men" is more pronounced. Matt says, "Their stuff's way too cutesy for me," in an attempt to assert masculine authority over Callie. Another instance of this, is when he displays his "craving for dominance" by telling Callie to focus less on the performers with the "intention of becoming the object of her affections." In the end, Matt expresses remorse for his actions and resists hegemonic masculinity.

Jesse's fight against masculine norms is subtler than Matt's. His hidden desire to perform on stage is held back by his fear of being judged for what he enjoys. He also encounters expectations of masculinity from his father, when asked if Callie was his girlfriend. Once Jesse resists hegemonic masculinity by playing the role of Miss Maybelle, this aids in his ability to realize his identity and come out.

Race 
Literary scholar Michelle Ann Abate presents a more critical view of Drama by arguing that the novel's romanticization of the antebellum South and lack of meaningful discussion of race limits its purpose as a celebration of diversity. For example, Abate contends that the title of the school play, Moon Over Mississippi, which serves as a backdrop for the events in the novel, represents a whitewashing and idealization of Southern plantation life, and ignores the realities of life during that era, including slavery. Although Raina Telgemeier's multicultural cast of characters in the novel is an attempt to promote diversity, the characters' failure to engage in dialogue about race, and power undermines her efforts. Abate observes that the absence of discussion about race among students at Eucalyptus Middle School reflects the situation of many American millennials, in which they reject racism and embrace tolerance and diversity, but are also uncomfortable with actually addressing issues of race. She claims that Dramas troubling treatment of both past and contemporary racial tensions ultimately compromises its status as a progressive novel that realistically portrays LGBTQ characters.

Reception 
Between 2012 and 2013, Drama received many positive remarks from various sources. Publishers Weekly stated that Drama "sweetly captur[es]" the challenges that are associated with a middle school production. Booklist Review claimed that "Telgemeier is prodigiously talented at telling cheerful stories with realistic portrayals of middle-school characters." Ada Calhoun of the NY Times Book Review commented, "Telgemeier's use of color, created with design team Gurihiru, is eloquent."

There is also high praise from The Gazette to Telgemeier for using the graphic novel style to present a more mature theme. According to The Gazette, Telgemeier does a wonderful job of being able to convey a theme usually meant for young adult readers, making it more accessible to the middle school audience the novel was written for. From the School Library Journal, there is discussion about how this graphic novel promotes a more positive view point when compared to other novels; however, this is not to say that Drama is without its prejudices. The article by Abate suggests that, in attempting to make her novel more inclusive, Telgemeier inadvertently fits her characters into stereotypes. This works directly against the perceived climax of her novel when Jesse fills in for Bonnie and kisses West on stage.

There is, however, some push back amongst libraries under the guise of not wanting to include graphic novels. Charles Brownstein, the director of the Comic Book Legal Defense Fund, does not agree with this genre losing legitimacy due to the inclusion of illustrations. Additionally, Brownstein continues to say, that Drama and other novels, "are clearly a vital aspect of current culture", and that controversy amongst graphic novels with relevant topics of discussion is expected.

Drama has been challenged by some parents and critics for being "sexually explicit", for having "subject matter too advanced for elementary students." and for "promoting the homosexual agenda". Drama has almost consistently received a spot on the American Library Association's Top Ten 10 of Banned Books from 2014 to 2019, and ultimately became the seventh-most banned book between 2010 and 2019.  In Texas, Drama was banned three years consecutively between 2014 and 2018. In 2014, a ban in Chapel Hill Elementary School in Mount Pleasant, Texas, put Drama on the American Library Association list of top 10 banned books. However, the details regarding the Chapel Hill Elementary School ban are limited since "there has been no news coverage... so details are thin on the ground." Its use was also restricted in Seele Elementary School in New Braunfels, Texas in 2014. At Kirbyville Junior High in Kirbyville, Texas, the book was also banned for being "politically, racially, or socially offensive" in 2016. During the 2016–17 school year, Drama was banned in the Franklin Independent School District in Franklin, Texas "most likely... due to the storyline involving a crush between two friends of main character Callie." That year, Drama was the only novel noted on the Texas ACLU list of banned books.

Common Sense Media, a company that rates media by age-appropriateness, has marked Drama as suitable for readers over 10 years of age. Common Sense Media acknowledges that "some readers may be uncomfortable with the graphic novel's depiction of homosexual crushes between young teens." Since this is a common point of contention, many schools will include novels with this type of young romance in order to normalize it and promote more equality. It is a popular opinion that in normalizing this type of relationship between homosexual individuals, there will be a positive impact on today's youth.

Michelle Abate, an Associate Professor of Literature for Children and Young Adults at The Ohio State University, argues that, "...the graphic novel demonstrates the limitations of LGBTQ youth advocacy that does not remain cognizant of intersectionality, while it also highlights the problem with millennial forms of multiculturalism that omit critical discussions about race." In her opinion, the musical production in Drama of Moon over Mississippi, a play about the Civil War that mimics Gone with the Wind, romanticizes the Antebellum South, thus limiting how progressive the novel can be. According to Abate, the production itself serves as a way of promoting the ideology of white supremacy from that era and therefore negatively impacts the novel's ability to serve as an effective advocate for the LGBTQ community.

In response to backlash for portraying gay characters in a children's book, Telgemeier replied by saying she is "grateful Scholastic has been willing to stand behind me on Drama." She also believes that "sexuality is a part of your identity that doesn't necessarily apply to what you are doing with other people when you are eight or nine years old," and that she doesn't attempt to force her viewpoints on anyone. She explained that her "agenda is love and friendship. People will make of it what they will and I can't let that sway the things I believe and the things I write about." Telgemeier continues to say "If a chaste heterosexual kiss had happened in Drama, no one would have batted an eye", meaning to discuss the double standard of the objections to this novel. This idea is consistent with other sources and praises for Drama such as The Gazette and Brownstein, that fully support the normalization of homosexual relationships, and also support her deliverance in the form of a graphic novel for this subjectively more mature theme.

Awards 
In 2012, Drama was declared a Notable Children's Books and a Teen Top Ten by the Association of Library Services to Children (ALSC) and the Young Adult Library Services Association (YALSA), which are all as part of the American Library Association.

Both Publishers Weekly and the Washington Post list Drama as one of the Best Books of 2012.

Also in 2012, NPR noted Drama as a novel that went under-recognized. In the NPR book review, Glen Weldon explained how, "If somebody handed this book to [him] in the seventh grade, [he] still would have been the same self-conscious jerk [he is], but it would have helped. It would have helped so much."

NPR also named Drama a "5 Great Summer Reads for Teens" in 2013. Petra Mayer, on NPR, described the artwork in the novel as "...simple but animated, and delightfully expressive."

Drama also won a 2013 Stonewall Book Award in Children's and Young Adult Literature, an award given by the American Library Association that serves to recognize authors who tackle LGBTQ related topics.

Drama was nominated for a Harvey Award in 2013 by a group of comic-book professionals for excellence in comics. The Harvey Award is one of the most prestigious and oldest accomplishments within the comic industry.

Also in 2013, the American Library Association deemed Drama as a Top 10 Great Graphic Novels for Teens.

Drama was placed on the Rainbow List in 2013, which is an annual list of books that are reviewed by the Committee of the Gay, Lesbian, Bisexual, and Transgender Round Table of the American Library Association.

References

2012 graphic novels
LGBT-related young adult novels
American LGBT novels
2012 LGBT-related literary works
2010s LGBT novels
LGBT-related graphic novels
Scholastic Corporation books
Censored books
Works about performing arts education